Derek Possee (born 14 February 1946) is an English former professional footballer who played as a winger. In a professional career which lasted from 1963 to 1979, Possee made over 400 league appearances, scoring over 100 league goals. He is Millwall's third all-time leading scorer, with 87 goals in all competitions.

Career
Born in Southwark, Possee began his career as an apprentice at Tottenham Hotspur, before becoming a professional there. In January 1964 he scored on his debut in a 3–1 victory over Aston Villa at White Hart Lane. 

Possee also played in the Football League for Millwall, Crystal Palace and Leyton Orient.

He signed for St Patrick's Athletic in October 1977 under Barry Bridges and scored twice on his debut on the 16th.

Possee then spent three seasons in the North American Soccer League with the Vancouver Whitecaps, helping them to win the Soccer Bowl in 1979.

Possee suffered tragedy in his post playing career life. His son Danny, aged 22, was shot and killed by police in 1992 whilst they were executing a warrant for a narcotics arrest.

Honours
  Soccer Bowl
 Vancouver Whitecaps 1979

References

External links
 
 NASL career stats
 Sporting Heroes
 Millwall Hall of Fame

1946 births
Living people
English footballers
Association football forwards
Tottenham Hotspur F.C. players
Millwall F.C. players
Crystal Palace F.C. players
Leyton Orient F.C. players
English Football League players
St Patrick's Athletic F.C. players
League of Ireland players
Vancouver Whitecaps (1974–1984) players
North American Soccer League (1968–1984) players
English expatriate sportspeople in Canada
Expatriate soccer players in Canada
English expatriate footballers
Expatriate association footballers in the Republic of Ireland